Pollachius pollachius is a species of marine fish in the family Gadidae. FAO uses the English name pollack for this species, whereas in American English it is known as European pollock. Other vernacular names include lythe,  and in the Isle of Man, calig.

It is common in the north-eastern parts of the Northern Atlantic, including the Bay of Biscay and North Sea.

Ecology and life history
Pollack are fast-growing and relatively short-lived. The maximum reported age is 15 years. They are said to spawn offshore, although their spawning grounds are poorly known; a study of a fjord population in Norway suggested local spawning.

Pollack are benthopelagic, that is, they live near the sea floor. They seem to be relatively sedentary.

Fisheries
Pollack is of value to fisheries, although it mainly represents bycatch. Landings data show three fairly distinct centres of distribution, one in the northern North Sea/Skagerrak extending north along the Norwegian coast, one between the English Channel, the Irish Sea, and the northern part of the French west coast, and one in the Iberian waters. Total reported landings are on the order of a few thousand tonnes.

Pollack is an important species in recreational fisheries. In Norway, tourist fishers alone were estimated to catch 100 tonnes of pollack in 2009. In France, 3,500 tonnes of pollock were estimated to be caught in all recreational fisheries.

References

External links

Pollock
Commercial fish
Fish of the Atlantic Ocean
Fish of the North Sea
Fish described in 1758
Taxa named by Carl Linnaeus